Valipe Ramgopal Rao is the Group Vice Chancellor of Birla Institute of Technology and Science, Pilani with campuses in Pilani, Hyderabad, Goa, Dubai and Mumbai. He was the Director of the Indian Institute of Technology, Delhi. He was a P.K.Kelkar Chair Professor in Department of Electrical Engineering, Indian Institute of Technology Bombay before joining IIT Delhi as the Director. Ramgopal Rao has more than 480 publications in various journals, and over 50 patents in the areas of Electron devices and Nanoelectronics. Ramgopal Rao was the first elected chairman for the Indian Section of the American Nano Society. He is also the recipient of multiple prizes including the Swarnajayanti Fellowship, Shanti Swarup Bhatnagar Prize, Infosys Prize, Techno-Visionary  award from the Indian Semiconductor Association in 2020, the IBM faculty award in 2007 and the IEEE EDS Education award in 2020 besides many others. He is a Fellow of IEEE, Fellow of the Indian National Academy of Engineering (INAE), Indian Academy of Sciences (IASc), National Academy of Sciences (NASI) and the Indian National Science Academy (INSA).

Indian Institute of Technology Delhi (IIT Delhi) director 
During Rao's tenure as Director, IIT Delhi has seen an unprecedented growth. IIT Delhi received the Institution of Eminence (IoE) status in 2018 under his leadership, one of the first three Govt institutions to be selected for this recognition following a tough selection process.

During his term, the annual research output of the institute (publications) has seen over a 100% growth. Over 225 new faculty members have been appointed in the institute during his tenure as Director. Institute has filed over 500 patents (more than the previous 55 years of total patent filings) and obtained record levels of industry and research funding. The sponsored research funding from competitive grants have gone up by four times in the institute during his tenure as Director. Through Faculty-Interdisciplinary Research Programme (FIRP) and Multi-institutional FIRP (M-FIRP) initiatives, an unprecedented growth has taken place in inter-institutional and inter-disciplinary research areas. Startup activities in the Institute have also reached record levels, thanks to the Faculty Innovation and Research Driven Entrepreneurship (FIRE) and the Student Startup Action Plan programmes initiated by Rao.

During Rao's tenure, the institute has also created 18 new Centers of Excellence with funding from alumni, industries  and  government  agencies. 10 New academic entities have been created during his time either by upgrading the existing Centers or by catalyzing new activities. Over 20 new academic programmes (such as B Tech, M.Sc., B.Des, MS(R)) have been launched by the institute during his term as Director. Two joint PhD programmes have been initiated with the University of Queensland in Australia and NCTU in Taiwan during his time. These are the first ever joint degree programmes at IIT Delhi.

Institute has also created over 2 Million sq. ft. of additional built up space under his leadership to meet the institute's expansion needs. Also, the alumni fund donations to the institute during his term have exceeded the last 55 year total value of donations by a large margin.

IIT Delhi's Endowment fund initiative launched under his leadership on Oct 31, 2019 by the Hon'ble President, Govt of India set a new benchmark for all other academic institutions in the country to follow. Ministry of Education has also issued a directive to all other educational institutions in the country to follow the IIT Delhi model.

Early life and education
Rao was born in a remote village Kollapur (Telangana) and He completed his Schooling  from Govt Upper Primary School Kollapur from 1st to 10th Std and then completed his   Intermediate from Govt RID Junior College Kollapur. Also, Mr.Rao completed all his education in Telugu Medium right from his 1st Std to 12th Std. Rao obtained his B.Tech degree in "Electronics and Instrumentation" from Kakatiya University in 1986 with distinction and his M.Tech from IIT Bombay in 1991. He obtained his Doctorate in Nanoelectronics from Bundeswehr University Munich, Germany in 1997 and was a Post-doctoral Fellow at the University of California Los Angeles from 1997 to 1998.

Career 
Rao spent 18 years as a faculty member at IIT Bombay before moving to IIT Delhi as the Director.  Rao has also held short term visiting positions in University of California, Los Angeles in May–July 2001 in the USA. After this, he worked for short periods of times at several universities all over the world, including Tokyo Institute of Technology, Monash University, The University of Calabria in Italy, Georgia Institute of Technology, Nanyang Technological University, University of Alberta, and McGill University. He was the Head of the Centre for Nanotechnology and Science at IIT Bombay between December 2005 and January 2007. He was P.K.Kelkar Chair Professor for Nanotechnology at IIT Bombay before moving to IIT Delhi as Director.

Awards
Infosys Prize for Engineering and Computer Science in 2013.
The Infosys Prize 2013 was awarded for Rao's "wide-ranging contributions to nanoscale electronics, for insightfully integrating chemistry with mechanics and electronics to invent new functional devices, and for innovation and entrepreneurship in creating technologies and products of societal value."

 2005 "Dr. Shanti Swarup Bhatnagar Prize in Engineering Sciences" presented by the Hon'ble Prime Minister, Govt.of India (S.S.Bhatnagar Prize) (the highest scientific award for researchers in India)
 H. H. Mathur Award for Excellence in Research in Applied Sciences, IIT Bombay (2012)
 IEEE Electron Device Society Education Award in 2020 for "educational leadership and establishing Nanoelectronics research programs in India”.
 Prof. C.N.R. Rao Bangalore INDIA NANO Science Award (2016)
 J.C.Bose National Fellowship, 2015
 DRDO Academic Excellence Award (2017) awarded by the Hon'ble Minister of Defence, Govt. of India
 Telangana State Award for Science & Technology, awarded by the Chief Minister of the state on the Telangana Formation day (2016).
 The National Academy of Sciences, India (NASI)-Reliance Industries Platinum Jubilee Award for Application Oriented Research for Physical Sciences, 2014
 2010 "DAE-SRC Outstanding Research Investigator" award from the Department of Atomic Energy-Science Research Council (DAE-SRC), an apex body of DAE, Govt. of India.
 2009 Indian Semiconductor Association's (ISA) TechnoMentor Award
 'Swarnajayanti Fellowship' Award (2003–04), Department of Science and Technology, Govt. of India (Swarnajayanti Fellowship) (this prestigious fellowship is instituted by Govt. of India in 1997 to mark 50 years of India's independence)
 IIT Bombay "Industrial Impact Award" in 2008 for undertaking research work that caused maximum industry impact
 2016 VASVIK Award in the category of Information & Communications Technology
 Fellow, IEEE (Elected in 2017 "for his contributions to CMOS System-on-Chip technologies")
 Fellow, Indian National Science Academy (INSA), New Delhi
 Fellow, Indian Academy of Sciences (IASc), Bangalore (Indian Academy of Sciences)
 Fellow, The National Academy of Sciences, Allahabad (The National Academy of Sciences)
 Fellow, Indian National Academy of Engineering (INAE) (Indian National Academy of Engineering)
 Fellow- IETE & Invited Member-Society for Cancer Research and Communication (www.scraci.com)
 Editor, IEEE Transactions on Electron Devices (2003-2012) (IEEE T-ED Editorial Board)
 2008 'The Materials Research Society of India (MRSI)-ICSC Superconductivity & Materials Science Prize' (presented at the 19th Annual General body meeting of the MRSI by Dr. R. A. Mashelkar, President, MRSI)
 2007 IBM Faculty Award (IBM Faculty Award)
 Best Research Paper Award, Global Interposer Technology (GIT) Workshop: Design, Technologies, Applications, Markets and Manufacturing Infrastructure, 14–15 November 2011, Georgia Institute of Technology, Atlanta Georgia USA (decided by an eminent jury of industry professionals)

References

External links 
 Infosys Science Foundation
 Rao's official IIT Bombay webpage
 IIT Delhi Director's official report presented during Convocation

IIT Bombay alumni
Indian Institute of Technology directors
Living people
Year of birth missing (living people)